Richard Berkeley Bell (November 8, 1907 – June 15, 1967) was an American male tennis player who ranked No. 7 among the U.S. amateurs in 1934.

He twice reached the final of the men's doubles competition at the U.S. National Championships (now US Open). In 1929 he partnered with Lewis White and lost the final in four sets against George Lott and John Doeg. Two years later, in 1931, he teamed up with Gregory Mangin and lost to John Van Ryn and Wilmer Allison in three straight sets.  His best singles performance came in 1931 when he reached the quarterfinals at the U.S. National Championships but lost in three straight sets to Fred Perry.

Bell won the Seabright Invitational in 1934. Together with Gregory Mangin he won the doubles title National Indoors Tennis Championships, played at the Seventh Regiment Armory in New York.  He turned pro in December 1935.

Berkeley Bell died aged 59 of a heart attack after taking part in a tennis tournament for veteran players.

Grand Slam finals

Doubles (2 runner-ups)

References

External links
 

1907 births
1967 deaths
American male tennis players
Tennis players from Austin, Texas
Professional tennis players before the Open Era
Texas Longhorns men's tennis players